Gerrit de Blanken (Leiderdorp, 12 October 1894 – Zoeterwoude, 6 May 1961) was a Dutch potter trained for running serial work, but he gradually focussed on art pottery.

Life and work 
In 1910 de Blanken began working at a flower-pots turning in Leiderdorp. Subsequently, he worked at several potteries, including the tile factory Amphora in Oegstgeest.

Since 1924 he was an independent potter with his own studio, successively in Leiderdorp (1919-1925) and in Zoeterwoude-Rijndijk. He made simple utilitarian and decorative pottery, that was sold by, among others, 't Binnenhuis and Metz & Co.

Gerrit de Blanken manufactured exclusively turned pottery. His work has a sober style and is often very thin. Striking is the frequent use of different colours for the interior and exterior of a container or dish. He also produced ceramic designs by Chris Lebeau. One of his students in Zoeterwoude was Hans de Jong.

His work is included in the collections of the Gemeentemuseum Den Haag in The Hague, the Museum Boijmans Van Beuningen in Rotterdam, and the Princessehof Ceramics Museum in Leeuwarden.

Gallery

See also 
 List of Dutch ceramists

References

External links 

  Blanken, Gerrit de at capriolus.nl
 Works of Gerrit de Blanken at Keramiekmuseum Princessehof.

1894 births
1961 deaths
Dutch ceramists
People from Leiderdorp
20th-century ceramists